Eluf Dalgaard (26 May 1929 – 12 September 2004) was a Danish cyclist who competed both on the road and on track. As an amateur road racer he won the Tour of Sweden in 1952, the Peace Race in 1954, and the Scandinavian Race Uppsala in 1955. In 1957 he turned professional and rode the 1958 Tour de France. On track he won the national pursuit title in 1953 and 1957.

References 

1929 births
2004 deaths
Danish male cyclists
Cyclists from Copenhagen